Karl Dale Swartzel Jr. (June 19, 1907 – April 23, 1998) was the inventor of the operational amplifier (or 'opamp').  He filed the patent for the 'summing amplifier' in 1941 when working at Bell Labs.

References

1907 births
1998 deaths
20th-century American physicists
Scientists at Bell Labs
20th-century American inventors